Eryk Goczał (born 6 November 2004) is a Polish rally driver who currently competes in the World Rally-Raid Championship. Goczał won the Dakar Rally on debut in 2023 the SSV category, making him the youngest driver to win any category in the event.

Goczał is the son of Energylandia owner and rally-raid driver Marek Goczał.

Career
Goczał began driving in rally in 2019, driving a zero car for race organizers at events such as the Baja Europe and the Polish Rally-Raid championship. In 2021, he began competing in the Polish Drift Championship, where he won the BMP class in 2022. Goczał received his FIA competitive license in 2022 and entered the World Rally-Raid Championship in 2023 championship for his father's team. At the 2023 Dakar Rally, Goczał became the youngest driver to start the event, the youngest driver to win a stage, and the youngest driver to win overall in the event's history.

Rally results

Dakar Rally

Complete World Rally-Raid Championship results
(key)

* Season still in progress

Reference

Living people
2004 births
Polish rally drivers
Dakar Rally drivers
Dakar Rally winning drivers
Off-road racing drivers